La Prairie Township may refer to the following townships in the United States:

 La Prairie Township, Clearwater County, Minnesota
 La Prairie Township, Marshall County, Illinois